The James Boyter Shop, at 50 W. 200 North in Beaver, Utah, was built in 1911.  It was listed in the National Register of Historic Places in 1983.

It was originally used as a shop for James Boyter's monument-carving.  Boyter was a sculptor and carved headstones for cemeteries in the area, working with pink stone tuff and white marble brought from the mining town of Newhouse, Utah.  His works often featured lambs. He also was a stonemason and helped his brother Alexander Boyter in construction work.

See also
James Boyter House

References

National Register of Historic Places in Beaver County, Utah
Buildings and structures completed in 1911